Aaron Canavan (born 10 August 1975) is an amateur snooker player from Jersey.

Career
He was the surprise winner of the 2018 World Seniors Championship, beating Dennis Taylor along the way.

He beat Patrick Wallace 4–3 in the final. He won £10,000, and competed in the following World Snooker Championship qualifiers, losing 10–1 to Robert Milkins in the first round.

He also finished second in the 2019 Seniors 6-Red World Championship, losing to Jimmy White 4–2 in the final.

Non-ranking finals: 1 (1 title)
 2018 World Seniors Championship

References 

1975 births
Living people
Jersey sportspeople
Snooker players